Kheïr Eddine (also Hayreddin) is a town and commune in Mostaganem Province, Algeria. It is the capital of Kheïr Eddine District. According to the 1998 census it has a population of 22,241.

References

Communes of Mostaganem Province